Club Atlético Ferrocarril Midland is an Argentine football club based in the Libertad district of Merlo Partido, in the Greater Buenos Aires. The team currently plays in Primera C, the fourth division of Argentine football league system.

The club was founded on June 28, 1914 by workers of the Buenos Aires Midland Railway with the objective to participate in some sports and other social activities. In 1929 the club was divided into two divisions: "Club Midland" and "Club Atlético Libertad", but they were reunited in 1933.

Midland competed in the regional divisions until 1960 when the club gained its affiliation to the Argentine Football Association. One year later Midland started competing in the lowest league, Primera D. The club had a short run in the Primera C during the 1990s and even came to play in the Primera B.

In 1989 Midland set a South American record reaching a mark of 50 consecutive games being undefeated. In 2008-09 the team won the Primera D Metropolitana championship, therefore it was promoted to play in the Primera C Metropolitana.

Midland's main rivals are Ituzaingó, Deportivo Merlo and Argentino Merlo.

Titles
Primera D (3): 1968, 1988-89, 2008-09

External links
 
 

Association football clubs established in 1914
Football clubs in Buenos Aires Province
1914 establishments in Argentina
Railway association football teams